Moradabad (also Romanized as Morādābād; also known as Murādābād) is a village in Khafrak-e Olya Rural District, Seyyedan District, Marvdasht County, Fars Province, Iran. At the 2006 census, its population was 314, in 69 families.

References 

Populated places in Marvdasht County